The 2004 Welsh Open was a professional ranking snooker tournament that took place between 15 and 25 January at the Welsh Institute of Sport in Cardiff, Wales.

Stephen Hendry was the defending champion, but he lost in the quarter-finals 4–5 against Marco Fu.

Ronnie O'Sullivan recovered from 5–8 down to defeat Steve Davis 9–8 in the final. This was O'Sullivan's 14th ranking title of his career.

Tournament summary 
Defending champion Stephen Hendry was the number 1 seed with World Champion Mark Williams seeded 2. The remaining places were allocated to players based on the world rankings.

Prize fund
The breakdown of prize money for this year is shown below: 

Winner: £52,000
Runner-up: £26,000
Semi-final: £13,000
Quarter-final: £9,500
Last 16: £7,450
Last 32: £5,600
Last 48: £3,900
Last 64: £2,750

Last 80: £1,750
Last 96: £1,100
Stage one highest break: £1,800
Stage two highest break: £5,000
Stage one maximum break: £5,000
Stage two maximum break: £20,000
Total: £450,000

Main draw

Final

Qualifying
Qualifying for the tournament took place at Pontins in Prestatyn, Wales between 9 and 13 December 2003.

Round 1 
Best of 9 frames

Round 2–4

Century breaks

Qualifying stage centuries

 141  Barry Pinches
 139  Phil Williams
 124  Mark Davis
 122  Liu Song
 118  Andrew Higginson
 117  Ding Junhui
 117  Darren Morgan

 117  Mehmet Husnu
 115, 108  Ryan Day
 114  Bjorn Haneveer
 113  David Gilbert
 110  James Wattana
 106, 100  Scott MacKenzie
 100  Chris Melling

Televised stage centuries

 139, 125, 118, 116, 107, 103  Ronnie O'Sullivan
 137  Stuart Pettman
 133, 102  John Higgins
 133  Barry Pinches
 131  Anthony Hamilton
 128  Joe Perry
 127, 123, 117, 107  Robert Milkins
 123, 119, 105  Peter Ebdon
 123, 102  Stephen Hendry
 123  Ali Carter

 122  Mark Selby
 119, 107  Patrick Wallace
 119  Marco Fu
 116  Bjorn Haneveer
 105, 102  Steve Davis
 103, 101  Tony Drago
 103, 100  Alan McManus
 103  Mark Williams
 102  Mark King
 100  Chris Small

References

2004
Welsh Open
Open (snooker)
Welsh Open, 2004
Welsh Open